On 18 January 2018, a bus caught fire on the Samara–Shymkent road in Yrgyz District, Aktobe, Kazakhstan. The fire killed 52 passengers, with five persons escaping including the drivers.

Events
The fire occurred at around 10:30 AM (UTC+5:00) as the bus was transporting Uzbek migrant workers to Kazan in Russia.
All the deceased were Uzbeks; the survivors were Uzbek passengers and the Kazakh drivers. A side door was reportedly blocked, preventing exit from the vehicle.

Uzbekistan dispatched both Foreign and Emergencies Ministry  personnel to the scene, and announced that they would repatriate the bodies of the deceased with DNA testing used for identification.

Kazakh President Nursultan Nazarbayev sent a telegram of condolence to Uzbek President Shavkat Mirziyoyev. Condolences were also expressed by the presidents of
Tajikistan,
Georgia,
Azerbaijan,
Belarus
and Turkmenistan and King Abdullah II of Jordan.

Investigations
Later on the day of the fire, the Kazakh Ministry for Investments and Development stated the bus was a 29-year-old Setra S216 HDS with an expired technical safety certificate and no license to transport passengers but declined to comment on the immediate cause. The regional Emergency Situations Department stated that an electrical malfunction was being treated as an initial theory.

Both Kazakhstan and Uzbekistan launched investigations into the incident. A special Uzbek commission was created by Mirziyoev to be headed by Prime Minister Abdulla Aripov  with an initial focus on potential traffic rule violations. A special criminal investigation was set up by the Kazakh authorities.

On 19 January, investigators released a statement based upon the testimony of the survivors, which stated that an open flame cooker used as a heating device was considered the likely source of the ignition, as the bus itself did not have a functional heater. The bus was carrying gasoline containers due to the absence of refueling stations on the long and remote road, one of which was reportedly knocked over near the open flame resulting in the blaze.

A preliminary list of victims released by Uzbekistan’s Emergency Situations Ministry released on 19 January listed 29 identified casualties as well as the two Uzbek survivors, all of whom were men from the Namangan Region.

On 25 January the drivers were detained by the Kazakh authorities.

See also
 List of transportation fires

References

2018 disasters in Kazakhstan
2018 fires in Asia
2018 road incidents
2018
Bus incidents
January 2018 events in Kazakhstan
Road incidents in Kazakhstan